Speedway Motorsports, LLC is an American company that owns and manages auto racing facilities that host races sanctioned by NASCAR, IndyCar Series, NHRA, World of Outlaws and other racing series. The company was founded by Bruton Smith and has its headquarters at Charlotte Motor Speedway, in Concord, North Carolina, just north of Charlotte. Speedway Motorsports owns nine racing facilities with a combined seating capacity of approximately 885,000. In addition to operating racetracks, Speedway Motorsports owns Performance Racing Network (PRN), U.S. Legend Cars International, and co-owns Motorsports Authentics.

After trading for 25 years on the New York Stock Exchange, where it was known as Speedway Motorsports, Inc. (SMI), the company was taken private in September 2019, and today is a wholly owned subsidiary of Sonic Financial Corporation, itself owned by members of Bruton Smith's family. The "SMI" abbreviation is still sometimes used colloquially.

History
Speedway Motorsports didn't officially incorporate until 1994. Bruton Smith began building SMI in the 1950s when he worked as a race promoter and eventually built Charlotte Motor Speedway in 1959. Smith left the racing business in the early 1960s to pursue other business ventures. He became very successful and by 1975 had owned majority shares in CMS and took over as CEO. A year later he appointed H.A. "Humpy" Wheeler as general manager. Smith began to expand CMS, adding additional grandstands and facilities including condominiums, a first for a sports facility.

In 1990, Smith began to acquire additional speedway properties beginning with Atlanta Motor Speedway. As he did with Charlotte, Smith began expanding seating and facilities at Atlanta. In 1992, lights were added to CMS, making it one of the first speedways to offer night racing, and the company developed the Legends car racing circuit, now called U.S. Legend Cars International. Smith incorporated Speedway Motorsports in December 1994, and on February 24, 1995 took the company public by offering shares of stock, debuting at $18 per share.

In 1996, SMI began to quickly expand, acquiring two additional facilities; Bristol Motor Speedway and Sonoma Raceway. A year later, the company finished construction of the $250 million, 150,000 seat Texas Motor Speedway. Between 1993 and 1998, SMI had increased its total seating capacity from 176,000 to 551,000. In 1999 SMI outbid rival International Speedway Corporation (ISC) to purchase Las Vegas Motor Speedway. Smith had outbid ISC by $15 million to make a total $215 million purchase. That same year, SMI sold the naming rights of its flagship Charlotte Motor Speedway to Lowe's, a $35 million deal that would last until 2009.

Until 1999, Speedway Motorsports was the top track owner in the motorsports industry. That year, International Speedway Corporation, then the second largest track owner, acquired Penske Motorsports, then the third largest track owner. The $623 million deal propelled ISC to the top track owner, and SMI fell to second. Smith then turned his attention towards securing two NASCAR dates at each of his facilities. As of 2011, only four SMI owned tracks hold two NASCAR dates.

SMI purchased North Wilkesboro Speedway and New Hampshire Motor Speedway in 2007, and in 2008 purchased Kentucky Speedway. Today SMI owns nine racing facilities, eight of which are used to host major racing series including NASCAR, IndyCar and NHRA. As of December 31, 2009, the combined total permanent seating capacity was approximately 885,000. SMI owned tracks host 13 of the 36 NASCAR Cup Series races, including four races in the NASCAR playoffs, plus the NASCAR All-Star Race.

In December 2018, Nashville Fairgrounds Speedway operator Tony Formosa Jr. reached an agreement with Speedway Motorsports and its main Tennessee track Bristol Motor Speedway to co-operate the facility and make the necessary upgrades for the track to host NASCAR Xfinity Series and NASCAR Camping World Truck Series races again and continue to host weekly racing events. Efforts were renewed in late 2020 as SMI and Bristol launched negotiations with the City of Nashville with the goal of hosting NASCAR races as early as 2022. The track ultimately did not hold races in 2022, although talks between both parties continued.

When NASCAR announced that Circuit of the Americas in Austin, Texas, would host the national series beginning in 2021, SMI assumed management responsibilities for the NASCAR at COTA race weekend.

In addition to speedway properties, SMI also owns Performance Racing Network, a radio network that broadcasts all NASCAR races at SMI owned tracks. SMI also equally owns Motorsports Authentics, a joint venture formed with International Speedway Corporation, to produce, market and sell licensed motorsports merchandise.

Facilities owned

Notable purchases
SMI has a history of purchasing tracks to obtain NASCAR race dates. The company's purchases and closures of the tracks in order to obtain a second NASCAR date for Texas Motor Speedway led to the Ferko lawsuit.

North Wilkesboro Speedway
In 1996, the company purchased half interest in North Wilkesboro Speedway in North Wilkesboro, North Carolina along with Bob Bahre of New Hampshire International Speedway (now New Hampshire Motor Speedway). SMI moved one of North Wilkesboro Speedway's dates to Texas Motor Speedway and Bob Bahre moved the second date to his facility.  On November 2, 2007, SMI purchased NHIS and part of the purchase resulted in SMI gaining full ownership of North Wilkesboro Speedway.

North Carolina Speedway
In 2004, as a result of the Ferko lawsuit, SMI gained ownership of the North Carolina Speedway in Rockingham, North Carolina. SMI closed North Carolina Speedway and moved the track's final race date to Texas Motor Speedway.  On October 2, 2007, SMI sold North Carolina Speedway at auction. The track was purchased by "Indiana" Andy Hillenburg for $4.4 million, and renamed Rockingham Speedway.

New Hampshire Motor Speedway
On November 2, 2007, SMI announced the purchase of New Hampshire International Speedway from Bob Bahre, and renamed the facility New Hampshire Motor Speedway. This has led to speculation that SMI would move one of New Hampshire's dates to Las Vegas Motor Speedway and/or swap the date with the fall race at Texas Motor Speedway (TMS has expressed an interest in moving the fall race away from the first weekend in November, which is also the opening weekend of deer hunting season in Texas). In 2018, the fall race weekend was moved to Las Vegas.

Kentucky Speedway
On May 22, 2008, SMI announced it had purchased Kentucky Speedway from Kentucky Speedway, LLC. It was purchased from Joie Chitwood.  The track had been trying to secure a NASCAR Sprint Cup race for several years. SMI was finally victorious in their pursuit, with Kentucky Speedway receiving its inaugural Sprint Cup race on July 9, 2011. It appears this came at the expense of SMI-owned Atlanta Motor Speedway, which dropped from two races to one on the 2011 Sprint Cup schedule. It was announced in September 2020 that Kentucky Speedway would not return for the 2021 NASCAR Cup Series schedule, and its date would be given back to Atlanta Motor Speedway.

Dover Motorsports

Dover Motorsports, Inc. (formerly Dover Downs Entertainment) was a company that owned several auto racing circuits in the United States. The company was based in Dover, Delaware, the home of its flagship track Dover International Speedway, a  concrete oval with a seating capacity of 95,500 that opened in 1969. The company formerly owned the Dover Downs harness racing track adjacent to the Dover speedway. Dover Motorsports also operated Nashville Superspeedway, a 1.333-mile concrete oval track in Lebanon, Tennessee.

Dover Motorsports owned Memphis Motorsports Park, a 0.75-mile tri-oval asphalt short track in Millington, Tennessee, but closed the track in October 2009 to competition. It was later sold to Palm Beach International Raceway after sitting unused for over a year. Dover also owned Gateway International Raceway, a 1.25-mile egg-shaped asphalt oval track in Madison, Illinois, which was sold in 2011. After attempts to sale Nashville Superspeedway, the venue reopened in 2021 and hosted a NASCAR race weekend, replacing one of the race weekends at Dover International Speedway.

On November 8, 2021, Speedway Motorsports announced that it had agreed to purchase Dover Motorsports, owner of Dover International Speedway and Nashville Superspeedway at the time, for $3.61 per share in cash for an approximate total equity value of $131.5 million. The deal closed in December, with SMI gaining full control of the two tracks.

Principal subsidiaries

Tracks
Atlanta Motor Speedway, Inc.
Bristol Motor Speedway, Inc.
Charlotte Motor Speedway, Inc.
Las Vegas Motor Speedway LLC
SPR Acquisition Corporation d/b/a Sears Point Raceway
Texas Motor Speedway, Inc.
Dover Motor Speedway, Inc.
Nashville Superspeedway, Inc.

Other
Speedway Systems LLC d/b/a Finish Line Events
600 Racing, Inc.
INEX Corporation
The Speedway Club, Inc.
Oil-Chem Research Corporation
Speedway Funding Corporation
Sonoma Funding Corporation

Principal competitors
International Speedway Corporation

References

External links
Official website
Company profile

NASCAR
Entertainment companies of the United States
Companies based in Charlotte, North Carolina
Entertainment companies established in 1959
Companies formerly listed on the New York Stock Exchange
Concord, North Carolina
1995 initial public offerings
American companies established in 1959
1959 establishments in North Carolina